Phullu Qiri (Aymara phullu mantilla, qiri scale,  also spelled Follo Kheri) is a  mountain in the Andes of Bolivia. It is located in the Oruro Department, Challapata Province, Challapata Municipality. Phullu Qiri lies southeast of Chullpa Chullpani. The Qala Jawira ("stone river") originates southwest of the mountain. It flows to the Crucero River.

References 

Mountains of Oruro Department